Pinilla de los Barruecos is a municipality and town located in the province of Burgos, Castile and León, Spain. According to the 2004 census (INE), the municipality has a population of 133 inhabitants.

People from Pinilla de los Barruecos 
 Álvaro Antón Camarero (born 1983), professional footballer

References

Municipalities in the Province of Burgos